The Satala Aphrodite is a larger-than-life–sized head of an ancient Hellenistic statue discovered in Satala (classical Armenia Minor, present-day Sadak, Gümüşhane Province, Turkey). It was acquired by the British Museum in 1873, a year after its discovery, and is on display in the museum's Department of Greek and Roman Antiquities. Whether it represents the Greek goddess Aphrodite or her Armenian equivalent Anahit is the subject of debate. It is usually dated around the 2nd–1st centuries BC. The head is widely depicted in Armenian culture as an iconic symbol of the country's pre-Christian history.

Discovery and acquisition by the British Museum

The man uncovered several bronze statue fragments including the head and a hand. The head was acquired in Constantinople by Savas Kougioumtsoglou, a Greek antiquities dealer, who passed it to another dealer, who was then Ottoman ambassador to Italy. Photiades took it to Rome, where it was sold to the art dealer Alessandro Castellani, an Italian goldsmith and collector, who in turn sold it to the British Museum in 1873. 

Gunning noted that "extraordinary efforts" were made to acquire it. She argues that it was sold in violation of both Ottoman and Italian laws. Castellani bribed Italian customs officials to export his collection. The acquisition was negotiated by Charles Thomas Newton, keeper of the museum's Department of Greek and Roman Antiquities. Newton appealed directly to Prime Minister William Ewart Gladstone, who agreed to provide £27,000 (£2 million in 2021) for Castellani's collection. The rest of the statue was never found, despite excavations by Alfred Biliotti and David George Hogarth.

Description
The head was first described by the German archaeologist Richard Engelmann in 1878. Engelmann's article was translated into Armenian in 1883 by the Mekhitarists of San Lazzaro, Venice.

The head and the hand belonged to a statue, from which they were removed. The back of the head and neck are severely damaged, though the face has largely been preserved. The top of the head was damaged during excavation. The face shows signs of oxidisation, while the front of the neck had two faults in casting, which have been repaired by the insertion of strips of bronze. The eyes originally had either inlaid gemstones or glass. H. B. Walters described the head in 1899:

Origin
The origin of the statue is unknown and debated among scholars. According to the British Museum, it is from the 1st century BC. Robert H. Hewsen argues that the head, "so often touted as an example of Hellenistic art in Armenia [...] is certainly a work of external origin probably imported from Asia Minor." James R. Russell suggests that it was probably cast in western Asia Minor in the 2nd–1st centuries BC. Vrej Nersessian writes that it was probably created in Asia Minor in the mid-4th century BC. Terence Mitford argued, based on its style, that it is a work of the "late Hellenistic or early Roman period". Reynold Higgins suggested that "it may be a cast from a mould made in c. 150 B.C., whether a Greek or Hellenistic original, or a Roman copy." Brunilde Sismondo Ridgway writes that it is dated no earlier than the Augustan period. Babken Arakelian argued, based on a stylistic analysis, that the head is similar to statues created in Asia Minor in the 2nd century BC. H.B. Walters suggested that its style "may be referred to the middle of the fourth century B.C."

Aphrodite or Anahit(a)

As early as 1873 Charles Thomas Newton identified the head with Venus. It is now usually interpreted as representing Aphrodite. Ghevont Alishan, in his 1890 book Ayrarat, first insisted that the head represents Anahit, the Armenian equivalent of Aphrodite. Some scholars have adopted this view, based on the proximity of a major temple of Anahit in Erez (Eriza) (present-day Erzincan). Both Satala and Erez were located in the Acilisene (Եկեղեաց, Ekełeats‘) province of classical Armenia Minor. Satala was also, for centuries, the site of a Roman legionary headquarters. Timothy Bruce Mitford argues that the statue "must have been looted" from the sanctuary of Anaitis at Eriza, but C. S. Lightfoot rejects this view as baseless.

The British Museum's website describes the work as a "bronze head from a cult statue of Anahita in the guise of Aphrodite or Artemis." The Armenian scholar Mardiros Ananikian wrote in The Mythology of All Races (1925) that it is a "Greek work (probably Aphrodite), found at Satala, worshiped by the Armenians." James R. Russell described it as "of the Greek Aphrodite type," "believed to be from a statue of Anahit but more probably from a Roman temple". 

H. B. Walters suggested that it may have been a copy of the Cnidian Aphrodite based on the left hand holding drapery at her side, but noted that "it is by no means certain that the head represents Aphrodite." Terence Mitford suggests that it is "normally assigned to Aphrodite" and an identification as Anaitis (Anahita) is "wholly implausible". Dyfri Williams wrote that it comes from a Greek cult statue, "probably made in a Greek city in Turkey". Babken Arakelyan found Artemis to be a more probable subject of the statue than Aphrodite.

Sirarpie Der Nersessian wrote that the head is a Greek work and the "only surviving example of the statues, which according to tradition, were brought from the Hellenistic cities by Tigran the Great." Robert H. Hewsen posited that it is "an obviously Hellenistic work, probably created in one of the ateliers of Asia Minor, it is surely not to be identified with any Armenian deity." Zhores Khachatryan stated that "the Armenian origin of the statue still has to be proven". He believes that "it is more possible that it may be the statue of a Roman pagan goddess" as it was found near the site of a Roman camp inhabited during the time period of its assumed creation. Khachatryan had no doubt that it is a replica of Aphrodite of Knidos.

Reception in the West

In a 1873 letter to Prime Minister Gladstone, Charles Thomas Newton wrote that the head is "the finest example of Greek work in metal" he had seen. He added that it is "the work which in beauty of conception and mastery of execution has most claim to rank next to the marbles of the Parthenon." In a Times article, Newton wrote that the first impression produced by the head is that of "majestic godlike beauty." In 1894 art historian Arthur Frothingham described the bronze head as "one of the glories of the British Museum". James R. Russell described it as a "piece of very fine workmanship." Sara Anderson Immerwahr called the bronze head "famous" and "lovely" that depicts "restless beauty". She argued that its "more than life-sized proportions but the ideal beauty and absence of individualized features suggest a goddess, yet the greater contrast of light and shade in the highly modelled strands of hair and the dramatic turn of the head toward the left bespeak the more baroque transformation of the Classical in the second century [BC], such as we find in the heads of goddesses on the Great Altar at Pergamon."

Reception in Armenia

George Bournoutian wrote that the head is the only surviving example of the numerous statues brought to Armenia by Greek priests and cults. Babken Arakelyan considered it the most prominent of all Hellenistic statues found in historical Armenia. It has become a symbol of Armenian culture, and a "rare surviving example of ancient Armenian cultural heritage."

A replica of the head has been on display at the History Museum of Armenia in Yerevan since 1968. It also appeared on the 5,000 Armenian dram banknotes, which were in circulation from 1995 to 2005. The obverse side of the banknote depicted the Temple of Garni.

Efforts to move to Armenia
, a Soviet Armenian artist, proposed in 1966 to start talks with the British Museum to move the head to Armenia.

In February 2012 Armen Ashotyan, then Minister of Education and Science of Armenia from the ruling Republican Party (RPA), called for moving the fragments of the statue to Armenia. Ashotyan claimed that this was a personal and not a political initiative. By the end of February some 20,000 signatures were collected by the RPA-affiliated Armenia Youth Fund demanding that the fragments be moved to Armenia. One proponent of the campaign argued that the "sentimental value of the goddess Anahit's statue is worth far more to the Armenians than to the tourists and visitors of the British Museum". On March 7, 2012 some one hundred people, joined by Ashotyan, demonstrated in front of the British embassy in Yerevan, chanting "Anahit, come home!" A letter was handed over to the embassy thanking the United Kingdom for preserving the fragments, but claimed that "historical justice requires" that they "be repatriated and find refuge in the country of their origin". 

In response, UK ambassador Kathy Leach was quoted by the Armenian media as saying that the head will be temporarily exhibited in Armenia. Ashotyan responded that while he was thankful, "our ultimate goal is permanent return."

Zhores Khachatryan criticized the campaign as "pointless" and "populism that failed from the start." Vahan Gasparyan, head of the Ministry of Culture's Agency for the Preservation of Historical-Cultural Heritage, noted that the fragments were "not illegally exported from [Armenia], nor was it a war trophy, so that the ministry could try to return it with references to international treaties. It's possible only as an act of good will." , a BBC Russian Service journalist, noted that "it is quite obvious that the British Museum won't give anything to Armenia" and suggested that "the myths about Anahit are used in modern Armenia as a way to earn political points", which he described as populism.

Exhibitions
It has been displayed at the 1967 International and Universal Exposition in Montreal, Canada, at the British Library in 2001, in Abu Dhabi in 2012, and Palazzo Strozzi, Florence in 2015.

In popular culture
A 2000 painting, Still Life with Vensus's Mask (alternatively titled Still Life with Anahit's Mask) by Lavinia Bazhbeuk-Melikyan is inspired by the head. It currently hangs at the President's Residence in Yerevan.

The head appears on the cover of The Oxford History of Greece and the Hellenistic World (2002). 

Peter Balakian authored a poem titled "Head of Anahit/British Museum", which was published in Poetry magazine in 2016.

References

Bibliography

Ancient Greek and Roman sculptures in the British Museum
Sculptures of Greek goddesses
Hellenistic and Roman bronzes
Archaeological discoveries in Turkey
1872 archaeological discoveries
Sculptures of Venus